Lireh Sar (also Romanized as Līreh Sar; also known as Līresar and Līr Sar) is a village in Baladeh Rural District, Khorramabad District, Tonekabon County, Mazandaran Province, Iran. At the 2006 census, its population was 1,018, in 237 families.

References 

Populated places in Tonekabon County